Chlaeminus is a genus of beetles in the family Carabidae, containing the following species:

 Chlaeminus annamensis Tschitscherine, 1903
 Chlaeminus biguttatus Motschulsky, 1865
 Chlaeminus biplagiatus Chaudoir, 1869
 Chlaeminus cruciatus Chaudoir, 1869
 Chlaeminus fasciatus Straneo, 1954
 Chlaeminus flavoguttatus (Motschulsky, 1864)
 Chlaeminus kedirensis Andrewes, 1936
 Chlaeminus obscurus Straneo, 1951
 Chlaeminus quadriplagiatus Chaudoir, 1869
 Chlaeminus reductus Straneo, 1940
 Chlaeminus senegalensis Straneo, 1939
 Chlaeminus sexmaculatus Straneo, 1948
 Chlaeminus sparsepunctatus Jedlicka, 1935
 Chlaeminus tetrastictus Andrewes, 1936
 Chlaeminus unipustulatus Straneo, 1979
 Chlaeminus variegatus Straneo, 1939

References

Pterostichinae